Henri Kontinen and Goran Tošić were the defending champions, but both players chose not to defend their title.

Ruben Gonzales and Sean Thornley won the title, beating Elias Ymer and Anton Zaitcev 6–7(5–7), 7–6(12–10), [10–8]

Seeds

  Jesse Huta Galung /  Andreas Siljeström (semifinals)
  Antal van der Duim /  Boy Westerhof (first round)
  Ruben Gonzales /  Sean Thornley (champion)
  James Cluskey /  Darren Walsh (quarterfinals)

Draw

Draw

References 
 Draw

Tampere Open - Men's Doubles
2014 Men's Doubles